Rhodora X is a 2014 Philippine television drama thriller series broadcast by GMA Network. Directed by Albert Langitan, it stars Jennylyn Mercado in the title role. It premiered on January 27, 2014, on the network's Telebabad line up. The series concluded on May 30, 2014, with a total of 88 episodes. It was replaced by Ang Dalawang Mrs. Real in its timeslot.

The series is streaming online on YouTube.

Cast and characters

Lead cast
 Jennylyn Mercado as Rhodora Ferrer-Vasquez / Baby / Roxanne / Rowena

Supporting cast
 Yasmien Kurdi as Angela Ferrer-Aquino
 Mark Herras as Joaquin Vasquez
 Mark Anthony Fernandez as Nico Ledesma
 Frank Magalona as Santiago "Santi" Vasquez
 Vaness del Moral as Pia Sales-Alcantara
 Gardo Versoza as Derick Ferrer
 Glydel Mercado as Lourdes Sales-Ferrer
 Lollie Mara as Carmencita "Cita" Vasquez
 Irma Adlawan as Vivian Bautista
 Boots Anson-Roa as Amparo "Panchang" Sales

Guest cast
 Rez Cortez as a kidnapper
 Kiel Rodriguez as a kidnapper
 Gene Padilla as Peter
 Krista Miller as Tricia
 Carlo Gonzales as a bar customer
 Ken Chan as Ryan Ledesma
 Rafa Siguion-Reyna as a bar manager
 Ervic Vijandre as Ferdinand "Ferds" Salazar
 Jackie Lou Blanco as a lawyer
 Glaiza de Castro as a prisoner
 Martin del Rosario as Martin Aquino
 Kyle Ocampo as young Angela
 Ar Angel Aviles as young Rhodora
 Therese Malvar as young Roxanne
 Antone Luis Limgengco
 Sarah Lopez
 Phytos Ramirez as Dan

Ratings
According to AGB Nielsen Philippines' Mega Manila household television ratings, the pilot episode of Rhodora X earned a 15.8% rating. While the final episode scored an 18.9% rating.

Accolades

References

External links
 
 

2014 Philippine television series debuts
2014 Philippine television series endings
Filipino-language television shows
GMA Network drama series
Philippine thriller television series
Television shows set in Quezon City